The 2001 Great Alaska Shootout was held November 21, 2001, through November 24, 2001 at Sullivan Arena in Anchorage, Alaska

Brackets

Men's

Women's

References

Great Alaska Shootout
Great Alaska Shootout
Great Alaska Shootout
November 2001 sports events in the United States